The East Coast Asian American Student Union (ECAASU) is a 501(c)(3) nonprofit aiming to inspire, educate, and empower those interested in Asian American & Pacific Islander (AAPI) issues. Run by volunteers, ECAASU's advocacy work is conducted through outreach to AAPI student organizations across the country and by educating individuals through various programs that are held over the course of the year. ECAASU hosts an annual conference, which is currently known as the largest and oldest conference in the country for Asian American students. The organization's membership is primarily composed of universities from the eastern United States while its annual conferences draw students and activists from throughout the United States. ECAASU was originally established in 1978 as the East Coast Asian Student Union (ECASU) before changing its name during the 2005 conference. It currently attracts 1,000+ students to its annual conference.  The largest ECAASU was held at the University of Pennsylvania (March 4–6, 2010) which was attended by almost 1,700 students. Similarly, the 2013 ECAASU conference held at Columbia University drew in over 1,500 students from over 200 different colleges.

History

Early movements
The 1960s is often noted as a period of  social transformation of U.S. society, headed by the Civil Rights struggles and the anti-war movement, and fueled by the awakening to the injustice and inequality rooted deep in the contractions of U.S. society. Asian Americans began to critically reexamine their own experiences. Some Asian American students, disillusioned and outraged at the U.S. war of aggression in Vietnam, were among the first to organize anti-war protests.

Inspired by the civil rights struggles, Asian American students struggled alongside other Third World students at San Francisco State and across the country to demand that the university serve the people and open its doors to students of color. After exhausting all channels of communications, Third World students resorted to rallies, sit-ins, and takeovers that forced the University to open its doors. Thus, Asian Americans won the right to a quality education and entered universities and colleges in significant numbers. Ethnic studies and other supportive programs were established to include Asian Americans.

During the early 1970s, Asian American organizations were established to deal with their specific needs and concerns. Asian American student organizations (ASOs) were formed on campuses throughout the East Coast to address the issues of identity and educational rights. The first Asian American student organization was the Yale Asian American Students Association (Yale AASA), which was established in 1969. The group had 69 largely undergraduate members, who persuaded the Yale admissions office to recruit more Asian American students, organized campaigns around repealing Title II of the 1950 McCarren Act and to seek a fair trial for Black Panther Bobby Seale, developed the first Asian American Studies course on the East Coast (Spring semester 1970), and organized the first East Coast Asian American student conference, "Asians in America," which was held at Yale in April, 1970. Over 300 students from over 40 different colleges attended. Members of Yale AASA, led by editor Lowell Chun-Hoon and publisher Don Nakanishi, both members of Yale's Class of 1971, founded Amerasia Journal, the first academic journal for the field of Asian American Studies. The first issue was released in March, 1971. Some Asian American students formed community organizations to address basic issues of housing and health services.

Impact of the Bakke decision
In 1978, the Supreme Court upheld Allan Bakke's claim that he had not been admitted to UC Davis medical school due to "reverse discrimination." To many people, this decision represented an attack on the civil right gains made in the 1960s. It also sparked a huge struggle led by Third World students against this decision. The decision was a statewide challenge that required a new level of organization. Rallying against the Bakke Decision, Asian American students recognized the need for a network capable of providing a broader perspective, mutual support, and the capacity for collective action. This led to the founding of the West Coast Asian Pacific Student Union (APSU), the Midwest Asian Pacific American Student Organization network, and ECASU, with regions in the Mid-Atlantic and New England.

East Coast Asian Student Union
The 1980s was generally considered a period of conservatism with the Right on the move in attacking not only Affirmative Action, but also questioning: reproductive rights, language rights, freedom of speech, social services, environment, and "back to basics" in education. It is sometimes considered the "me" generation bombarded with "careerism" without any sense of social responsibility. Asian Americans were touted as the "successful," "model minority" in Newsweek and Time. All this came in the midst of wording economy and declining U.S. influences globally.

However, this decade has seen a plethora of changes, winding from the sudden surges in Asian American populations in colleges nationwide, to the scapegoating of Asians in the Clinton campaign scandal and the Lawrence Labs debacle. Even more recently, the Wen Ho Lee incident has shown that Asian Americans are not safe from racial profiling and stereotyping. In the past eight years, Asian populations in juvenile systems have doubled in parts of the country, and by all accounts the fissure between the haves and the have-nots has widened too far. APAs have also seen a resurgence of Asian American activism, from the gradual strengthening of collegiate groups to the bold organizing of the 80-20 Initiative. With eyes on these trends, ECASU looks to strengthen the East Coast Asian student community, and to bring us to new heights of awareness, activism, and pride in the APA community.

2007: ECAASU National Board Revival
Following the Yale ECAASU Conference, the National Board experienced a period of revival as well. The National Board itself grew from 2 people to 12 people, occupying 10 board positions. In addition, ECAASU began to apply for non-profit status. New boards were also created, including the Board of Directors (aka Directorate) and the ECAASU Representatives Council  (which includes about 60 people from 40 schools in 2008). The National Board has also taken steps to create ECAASU events outside of the yearly conference , including regional fall mixers. Last, the National Board has revived the ECAASU journal, which used to be called Asian American Spirit, now titled Envision. Last, ECAASU started the Affiliate Schools Project, an online database of profiles of ECAASU member schools.

Past National Board Chairs

Past conferences

Intercollegiate Liaison Committee (ICLC)
 1977, Yale University.

East Coast Asian Student Union (ECASU)
 1978, Princeton University; Asian Student Unity.
 1979, University of Massachusetts Amherst; Learning From the Past to Build Up to the Future.
 1980, Harvard University; Asian Students Organizing for the 80's.
 1981, Mount Holyoke College; Asian Women, Myth and Reality.
 1982, Harvard University; Rising to the Challenge.
 1983, Columbia University; Asian Students in Action.
 1984, Brown University; Asian Americans and the American Dream.
 1985, Smith College; Visions of Asians in America: Aspiration & Responsibilities.
 1986, Princeton University; Asian Students: New Directions...Beyond the Model Minority.
 1987, Boston University; Education in Action.
 1988, Cornell University; Momentum for Change: 10 Years of ECASU.
 1989, Hunter College; Asian Empowerment through Unity: A Challenging Future.
 1990, Smith College; The 1990 Census and Beyond: A Map for Asian American Impact in the United States.
 1991, Binghamton University; Speak Up, Speak Out: End of Marginalization.
 1992, Harvard University; Changing Faces of Asian American Community.
 1993, University of Pennsylvania; Lights, Camera, Action.
 1994, Yale University; APAs in the Arts and Media.
 1995, Duke University; Exposing the Plight of Asian Pacific Americans in our Nation's Inner Cities.
 1996, University of Maryland, College Park; Building Bridges to our Future.
 1997, University at Albany, SUNY; Where Do Asian Americans Fit in the Black and White Paradigm.
 1998, Cornell University; Leading the Way to the 21st Century. 
 1999, Brown University; Coming Together: A Pan-Asian Pacific American Movement into the Next Millennium. 
 2000, Yale University; Stepping Forward: identity, unity, action.
 2001, Columbia University; Evolution! 
 2002, Duke University; Strangers in America. 
 2003, Georgetown University; New Horizons.

East Coast Asian American Student Union (ECAASU)
 2004, University of Virginia; Awakening.
 2005, University of Pennsylvania; Impact: Our Own Making.
 2006, George Washington University; Foundations: Deep Roots, Lasting Growth.
 2007, Yale University; Breaking Through. 
 2008, Cornell University; Push Forward. 
 2009, Rutgers University; Distinct Worlds, One Vision. 
 2010, University of Pennsylvania; Behind These Eyes: Impression. Introspection. Innovation. 
 2011, University of Massachusetts - Amherst; B.R.E.A.K: Bridge, Revitalize, Equality, Action, Knowledge. 
 2012, Duke University; Rediscovery. Renaissance. Revolution.
 2013, Columbia University; Within. Across. Beyond. 
 2014, Washington, DC Coalition between Georgetown University, George Washington University, American University and University of Maryland - College Park; Mission IGNITION: Champion Your Cause. 
 2015, Harvard University; New Asian American 
 2016, Rutgers University; Beyond Our Boundaries.
 2017, North Carolina Triangle with The University of North Carolina at Chapel Hill, Duke University, and North Carolina State University; Atmosphere.
 2018, Cornell University; Continuum: Power Through Perspective.
 2019, Florida; Introspection 
 2020, Carnegie Mellon University, University of Pittsburgh; Building Bridges.

Bibliography

References

External links
 ECASU: East Coast Asian Student Union

Student societies in the United States
Non-profit organizations based in Connecticut
501(c)(3) organizations